The War Merit Cross was a military decoration of the Kingdom of Saxony.  Established 30 October 1915 by King Frederick Augustus III of Saxony, it was awarded for humanitarian and patriotic work towards the war effort.

Appearance
The War Merit Cross is made of bronze and in the shape of a Latin cross pattée.  Between the arms of the cross is a laurel wreath.  The obverse bears a circular medallion in the center with the left facing effigy of King Friedrich August III.  Circumscribed  around the medallion is FRIEDRICH AUGUST KÖNIG V. SACHSEN.  In the upper arm is the Saxon crown and the date 1915 on the lower arm.  The reverse of the central medallion bears the crowned cipher of King Friedrich August III.  The left arm is inscribed WELT- and the right arm inscribed KRIEG (World War).

References

Orders, decorations, and medals of Saxony
Military of Saxony